Lalbabu Raut Gaddhi (Nepali/Maithili/Bhojpuri: लालबाबु राउत)is the first Chief Minister of Madhesh Province, one of the seven federal Provinces of Nepal. He is the parliamentary party leader of People's Socialist Party, Nepal for Madhesh Province.

Raut remains in light in national medias for various irregularities cases during his tenure including the Swachatta Abhiyan, Janaki Mandir beautification, and Beti Bachau Beti Padhau abhiyan for which cases are filed in CIAA.

Personal life 
Before being elected in the first-ever constitutional assembly, Raut had also served few years as a teacher in Thakur-ram Multiple Campus at Birgunj.

Political career 
Raut, a resident of Parsa was elected to the 2017 provincial assembly elections from Parsa 1(B). Earlier, he served as a member of the Constituent Assembly which promulgated the Constitution of Nepal 2015. On 15 February 2018, Governor Ratneshwar Lal Kayastha administered the oath of office and secrecy to Raut at the governor's office in Janakpur.

Recently, he lost his home town, Jagarnathpur to Shreekant Prasad Yadav of Nepali Congress while his wife lost as deputy chairperson candidate.

See also
 Rajendra Kumar Rai
 Rajendra Prasad Pandey
 Krishna Chandra Nepali
 Kul Prasad KC
 Jeevan Bahadur Shahi
 Trilochan Bhatta

References

External links 

Living people
People from Parsa District
Madhesi people
Nepalese Muslims
1966 births
Chief Ministers of Nepalese provinces
Members of the Provincial Assembly of Madhesh Province
Members of the 2nd Nepalese Constituent Assembly
People's Socialist Party, Nepal politicians